Primulin may refer to:
 Primulin (anthocyanin), a phenolic compound
 an alternate spelling for primuline, a dye containing the benzothiazole ring system
 Primulines, one of the main hybrid groups of the ornamental flower Gladiolus